Since its foundation in 1563, Elizabeth College has had 42 principals overseeing the running of the school. The principal was formerly known as the master of the school. Since the appointment of Rev. Dr Charles Stocker as principal in 1824, portraits have been made of every principal of the school, except Rev. George Proctor. These are kept in the Le Marchant library, situated at the very top of the middle spire of the main building.

List of principals

References

Bibliography

External links
 
 

Independent schools in Guernsey
Educational institutions established in the 1560s
Buildings and structures in Saint Peter Port
Boys' schools in British Overseas Territories and Crown Dependencies
Secondary schools in the Channel Islands